A fixation agent is a chemical that is capable to fixate one substance to another substance that the first substance have little affinity to.

Applications

Pulp and paper production
In pulp and paper production fixation agents are used to fixate pitch or stickies to the paper fibers to transport the problems out of the production process and have a cleaner production plant.

As fixation agents used in pulp and paper production are minerals like talc and bentonite or different cationic polymers like polyDADMAC. The polymer based fixation agents are often called detackifiers as they reduce the tackiness of the pitch and stickies.

Process chemicals